Beautiful Wreck of the World is the fourth studio album from American musician Willie Nile. It was released in 1999 by Nile's label River House Records.
Uncut: "the majestic "On The Road to Calvary (For Jeff Buckley)" is soul music of the deepest order".

Track listing

Personnel
Musicians
 Willie Nile – guitar, vocals, piano, keyboard
 Andy York  – lead guitar, backing vocals
 Brad Albetta – bass guitar
 Rich Pagano – drums, percussion, backing vocals
 Frankie Lee – guitar, drums, backing vocals on "Beautiful Wreck" and "Oatmeal", tambourine on "Somewhere It's Raining"
 Mickey Raphael – echo harp on "Calvary"
 Chris Byrne – uilleann pipes on "Beautiful Wreck", tin whistle on "Oatmeal"
 Stewart Lerman  – organ on "Oatmeal", guitar & organ on "Beautiful Wreck"
 Bruce Tunkel – backing vocals on "Oatmeal"
Production and additional personnel
 Executive Producer: George Hecksher
 Produced by Willie Nile, Frankie Lee, Brad Albetta, Andy York, Rich Pagano
 Engineered by Brad Albetta, Rich Lamb, Rich Pagano, Bruce Tunkel
 Mixing by Stewart Lerman at The Shinebox, Rich Pagano at New Calcutta Recordings
 Mastering by Vince Carp at BMG Studios, NYC
 Art direction by George Philhower
 Photography Godlis, Margaret Bevan

References

1999 albums
Willie Nile albums